The Diocese of Norwich (Latin: Diœcesis Norvicensis) is a Latin Church ecclesiastical territory, or diocese, of the Catholic Church in the states of Connecticut and New York in the United States. It was erected on August 6, 1953, by Pope Pius XII.

History

1600 to 1953 
In the 17th and much of the 18th century, Puritan ministers in the British Province of Connecticut were vociferously anti-Catholic in their writings and preaching. They viewed the Catholic Church as a foreign political power and of Catholics as having loyalty only to the Vatican.

After the American Revolution, the first permanent Catholic parish in the new state of Connecticut was founded in 1781 in Lebanon.The Diocese of Boston was erected from the Diocese of Baltimore in 1808, taking all of the New England states under its jurisdiction. Priests from Massachusetts would periodically visit the scattered Catholic population in Connecticut. 

The construction of the Norwich and Worcester Railroad in the 1830's brought Irish Catholic workers into the region, leading to establishment of the first Catholic population in the area. In 1843, Pope Gregory XVI established the Diocese of Hartford, taking all of Connecticut and Rhode Island from the Diocese of Boston.  The Norwich area would be under the Diocese of Hartford for the next 100 years. The first Catholic parish in Norwich, St. Mary’s, opened in 1845 with 230 members. That number would increase to 5,000 by 1854.

1953 to 2002 
The Diocese of Norwich was created by Pius XII in 1953, taking its territory from the Diocese of Hartford. He appointed Reverend Bernard Flanagan from the Diocese of Burlington as the first bishop of Norwich. During his tenure, Flanagan oversaw the establishment of several secondary schools and parishes within his diocese. Pius XII transferred Fishers Island in 1957 from the Diocese of Brooklyn to the Diocese of Norwich.In 1959, Pope John XXIII named Flanagan as bishop of the Diocese of Worcester.

The second bishop of Norwich was Reverend Vincent Hines of the Archdiocese of Hartford, appointed by John XXIII in 1959.  During his tenure, Hines led a $1 million fundraising campaign for schools in the diocese.  He build Xavier High School in Middletown, Connecticut, for boys in 1963 and Mercy High School, also in Middletown, for girls in 1965. He also named the first nun to head a diocesan school system in Connecticut, and established a retirement program for priests. Hines retired in 1975.

In 1975, Pope Paul VI appointed Reverend Daniel Reilly of the Diocese of Providence as the third bishop of Norwich. He served in Norwich for 19 years, then was appointed in 1994 by Pope John Paul II as bishop of Worcester.  To replace Reilly in Norwich, the pope named Auxiliary Bishop Daniel Anthony Hart of the Archdiocese of Boston.During his eight-year-long, Hart raised over $15 million through his "Response of Faith Campaign" in 1998 for the support and maintenance of diocesan services. He also expanded the diocesan Catholic Charities. Hart retired in 2002.

2002 to present 
As of 2023, the bishop of Norwich is Michael Richard Cote, formerly an auxiliary bishop of the Diocese of Portland. He was appointed by John Paul II.

In 2004, Côté became embroiled in a dispute with Reverend Justinian B. Rweyemamu, the parochial vicar at St. Bernard Parish in Rockville, Connecticut.  Rweyemamu claimed that Côté had denied him a promotion because he is black.  After Rweyemamu filed a complaint with the US Equal Employment Opportunity Commission, Côté allegedly removed him from his parish and his chaplain job in retaliation.  Côté said he removed Rweyemamu due to his refusal to answers any questions about Bugurka Orphans and Community Economic Development, his private charity in Tanzania, and the content of some of his homilies.  In Spring 2005, Côté unsuccessfully sued to evict Rweyemamu from a church rectory.  In August 2005, Côté ordered him to move to a convent in Sprague, Connecticut and live in isolation.

On December 14, 2010, Côté announced that the diocese charity, Haitian Ministries for the Diocese of Norwich, was being replaced by a new organization, Diocese of Norwich Outreach to Haiti, Inc.  He mentioned that the diocese was slowly distributing $430,892 collected from parishioners in January that year to prevent waste and misappropriation.

Reports of sex abuse
On February 10, 2019, the Diocese of Norwich unveiled a list of 43 credibly accused clergy. Three more names were added to this list on February 22, 2019. On July 15, 2021, Bishop Côté announced that due to about 60 sexual abuse cases against the diocese related to the former Mount Saint John School in Deep River, Connecticut, the diocese had filed for Chapter 11 bankruptcy.

Territory 
The Diocese of Norwich consists of:

 The Connecticut counties of Middlesex, New London, Windham and Tolland
 Fishers Island in New York

Bishops

Bishops of Norwich
 Bernard Joseph Flanagan (1953-1959), appointed Bishop of Worcester
 Vincent Joseph Hines (1959-1975)
 Daniel Patrick Reilly (1975-1994), appointed Bishop of Worcester
 Daniel Anthony Hart (1995-2003)
 Michael Richard Cote (2003–present)

Other diocesan priest who became bishop
 Paul S. Loverde, appointed Auxiliary Bishop of Hartford in 1988 and later Bishop of Ogdensburg and Bishop of Arlington

Elementary schools (preK-grade 8) 
 Sacred Heart School, Groton
 Sacred Heart School, Taftville
 Saint James School, Danielson
 Saint John School, Old Saybrook
 Saint John Paul II School, Middletown
 Saint Joseph School, Baltic
 Saint Joseph School, New London
 Saint Joseph School, North Grosvernor Dale
 Saint Mary-Saint Joseph School, Willimantic
 Saint Michael School, Pawcatuck
 Saint Patrick Cathedral School, Norwich

High schools
 Academy of the Holy Family, Baltic
 Marianapolis Preparatory School, Thompson
 Mercy High School, Middletown
 Saint Bernard High School, Uncasville (6-12th grade)
 Xavier High School, Middletown

Holy Apostles College and Seminary 
The Diocese of Norwich funds Holy Apostles College and Seminary in Cromwell,  a two and four-year institution that offers undergraduate and graduate degrees programs.

See also

 Catholic Church by country
 Catholic Church in the United States
 Ecclesiastical Province of Hartford
 Global organisation of the Catholic Church
 List of Roman Catholic archdioceses (by country and continent)
 List of Roman Catholic dioceses (alphabetical) (including archdioceses)
 List of Roman Catholic dioceses (structured view) (including archdioceses)
 List of the Catholic dioceses of the United States

References

External links 
Roman Catholic Diocese of Norwich Official Site

Catholic Hierarchy

 
Catholic Church in Connecticut
Norwich, Connecticut
Christian organizations established in 1953
Norwich
Norwich
1953 establishments in Connecticut
Companies that filed for Chapter 11 bankruptcy in 2021